Dheburidheytherey Kandu is the narrow channel between Raa Atoll and Baa Atoll (Fasdhoothere) of the Maldives.

References
 Divehiraajjege Jōgrafīge Vanavaru. Muhammadu Ibrahim Lutfee. G.Sōsanī.

Channels of the Maldives
Channels of the Indian Ocean